Falmouth Trescobeas was an electoral division of Cornwall in the United Kingdom which returned one member to sit on Cornwall Council between 2013 and 2021. It was abolished at the 2021 local elections, being succeeded by Falmouth Trescobeas and Budock.

Councillors

Extent
Falmouth Trescobeas represented the north west of the town of Falmouth, including Mongleath and Falmouth School. Although the division was nominally abolished in 2013, this had very little effect on the ward. Both before and after the boundary changes, the division covered 149 hectares in total.

Election results

2017 election

2013 election

2009 election

References

Falmouth, Cornwall
Electoral divisions of Cornwall Council